

Étienne Charles Wenger (born 1952) is an educational theorist and practitioner, best known for his formulation (with Jean Lave) of the theory of situated cognition and his more recent work in the field of communities of practice.

Life
Having grown up in the French-speaking parts of Switzerland, Wenger achieved a B.S. in Computer Science from the University of Geneva, Switzerland, in 1982. He then studied at the University of California, Irvine, in the United States, gaining an M.S. in Information and Computer Science in 1984 and a Ph.D. in the same subject area in 1990. He currently lives in California, United States.

Work
Wenger initially came upon the concept of communities of practice when he was approached by John Seely Brown, to join the Institute for Research of Learning.  There Wenger worked with anthropologist Jean Lave, observing apprenticeships among traditional tailors in Africa.  Through the study of these cases Lave and Wenger concluded that most learning does not take place with the master, it takes place among the apprentices.

Wenger holds that learning is an inherently social process and that it cannot be separated from the social context in which it happens.  Among his current engagements are Communities of Practice for Accounting and Auditing Education as well as Audit and Oversight for the World Bank Centre for Financial Reporting Reform.

One of the first people to observe and study communities of practice, Etienne Wenger's work is applied in various fields.
According to Wenger, "Communities of practice are groups of people who share a concern or a passion for something they do and learn how to do it better as they interact regularly."

Wenger earned a Ph.D. in artificial intelligence, and worked with the Institute for Research on Learning to help apply his concept of communities of practice to education. He is frequently called upon to speak and host workshops centered on his findings.
To date he has published five books (see Bibliography section below).

He was an initiator of the now common research practice connecting learning to the technological and social aspects of communities.

Currently, Wenger is working  on "Learning for a Small Planet." This research is focused on how students learn in the 21st century, and how the integration of technology is affecting education. It is also emphasizing the various domains of learning: "education, business, and civic" and how it is not each one separately, but rather the synthesis of them that enables effective learning. It also goes on to discuss the identity of a learner, and is studying how one must be a participant in multiple groups to be able to form a full identity and learn successfully.

Selected publications

See also
 Situated learning
 Legitimate peripheral participation
 Community of practice
 Knowledge Management
 Landscape of practice

References

External links
 Etienne Wenger homepage
 Communities of practice and social learning systems
 A Community of Practice for Audit and Oversight, organized by Etienne Wenger at the World Bank
Brighton University personal profile of Etienne Wenger

1952 births
Living people
University of Geneva alumni
University of California, Irvine alumni
American people of Swiss descent
American educational theorists
Swiss educational theorists
Swiss sociologists